The Holy Innocents (1988) is a novel by Gilbert Adair about French siblings and an American stranger who enters their world. Its themes were inspired by Jean Cocteau's 1929 novel Les Enfants Terribles (The Holy Terrors) and by the 1950 film of the same name directed by Jean-Pierre Melville.

Publishing
The book has been printed in hardcover and paperback only once. The Holy Innocents was revised in conjunction with the development of the film, however, and this new version has been published under the title The Dreamers.

Plot
The Holy Innocents is the story of three young cinephiles, Matthew, an American studying in Paris, and the French twins Guillaume and Danielle. Set in the tumultuous months of 1968, it is a story of obsession and youth. 
The initial obsession is cinematic. Matthew is studying film, the twins are fascinated by the cinema, and they become close because of their shared interest. Spending their evenings at Paris' grand Cinémathèque they live only for the cinema. When French Culture Minister André Malraux fires Cinémathèque director Langlois, a prelude to the May uprising, the Cinémathèque is closed. A nation is thrown into confusion, but the three youngsters hardly notice: their small world has been ruined, and they do not know what to do. Matthew manages to establish a relationship with the twins beyond the confines of the Cinémathèque—though it is initially still cinematically centered. Invited for dinner at their house he is invited to spend the night, which he does. There he discovers that Danielle and Guillaume's relationship goes beyond the usual sibling intimacy—and finds he is not as troubled by this as he would have expected. Attracted to both of them he moves in with them, their father—a famous poet—and stepmother conveniently setting off for an extended stay in the country. 
The youngsters live in their own little world, not bothering to go to school any more, playing cinematic trivia games (raising the stakes all the while), reveling in their youth. They live the lives of innocents, cut off from society and civilization. They do not wash their clothes, they steal their food, they don't care about the world around them. They have sex as partners (in all permutations) and all together.  
They are finally thrust back into society in May 1968, only to find the siege on the streets as Paris has risen up around them.

Adaptation
A French-British-Italian co-produced film adaptation, The Dreamers, of the novel was made in 2003, directed by Bernardo Bertolucci and starring Louis Garrel, Eva Green, and Michael Pitt.

References

1988 British novels
British novels adapted into films
Novels by Gilbert Adair
Incest in fiction
Male bisexuality in fiction
Novels with bisexual themes
Bisexuality-related fiction
Twins in fiction
Heinemann (publisher) books
Novels set in Paris